Nyamaagiin Altankhuyag (born September 27, 1970) is a boxer from Mongolia, who competed in the bantamweight (– 54 kg) division at the 1988 Summer Olympics and the light-welterweight (– 63.5 kg) category at the 1992 Summer Olympics. He won a bronze medal in the light-welterweight category at the 1990 Asian Games in Beijing.

Olympic results
Represented Mongolia as a Bantamweight at the 1988 Olympic Games.
1st round bye
Defeated Grzegorz Jabłoński (Poland) 3-2
Defeated John Lowey (Ireland) 3-2
Lost to Phajol Moolsan (Thailand) 0-5

Represented Mongolia as a Light Welterweight at the 1992 Olympic Games.
Defeated Khamsavath Vilayphone (Laos) RSC-2
Lost to Peter Richardson (Great Britain) 4-21

References

External links
 
 Nyamaagiin Altankhuyag versus Grzegorz Jablonski 1988

1970 births
Living people
Bantamweight boxers
Light-welterweight boxers
Olympic boxers of Mongolia
Boxers at the 1988 Summer Olympics
Boxers at the 1992 Summer Olympics
Mongolian male boxers
Boxers at the 1990 Asian Games
Asian Games bronze medalists for Mongolia
Asian Games medalists in boxing
Medalists at the 1990 Asian Games
21st-century Mongolian people
20th-century Mongolian people